I'm Pregnant and... is an American reality television series broadcast on Discovery Fit & Health. The series tells the stories of women who face serious emotional, physical or mental issues or circumstances during their pregnancies. The ellipsis in the series title acts as a blank, filled in by the title of the week's episode; e.g.: "I'm Pregnant and... A Nudist" or "I'm Pregnant and... Homeless".

The series began on Discovery Health Channel on November 10, 2009. Season 1 concluded on December 29, 2009, after 6 episodes. Season 2 ran from July 20, 2010, to October 19, 2010, with 8 episodes. Season 3 ran from September 1 to 29, 2011, with 6 episodes.

The series moved to Discovery Fit & Health in 2011 after OWN replaced Discovery Health. Select episodes returned to OWN in April 2011 as one of several series from OWN's sister networks (also including Discovery Channel, TLC, Animal Planet and Investigation Discovery) to fill gaps in OWN's programming while they built their own library of original programs.

Social significance/issues
The issues or circumstances covered have social significance or consequences that make the casual viewer question why that mother is pregnant in the first place, and answer that question as the show unfolds. This is a notable departure from other pregnancy-themed reality series such as Deliver Me or I Didn't Know I Was Pregnant, where the pregnancies are not so socially complicated.

Episodes

References

External links
 Series information from Discovery Fit & Health
 
 
 Season 2 episode descriptions from Discovery Press Web
 Discussions of social implications from Television Without Pity forum

2009 American television series debuts
2011 American television series endings
2000s American reality television series
2010s American reality television series
2000s American medical television series
2010s American medical television series
Discovery Health Channel original programming